If You Could Hear Me Now is a compilation album by the American pop group The Walker Brothers. It was released in 2001. The album compiles material by the group from their mid-1970s reunion albums; No Regrets, Lines and Nite Flights. The compilation includes seven previously unreleased outtakes from the album sessions. All of the new material was later compiled on the expansive Walker Brothers boxset Everything Under the Sun – The Complete Studio Recordings in 2006.

Of the new material the original John Walker composition "The Ballad" and Scott Walker's unfinished disco-infused instrumental "Tokyo Rimshot" both from the Nite Flights sessions are the most notable.

Track listing

References

The Walker Brothers albums
2001 compilation albums
Columbia Records compilation albums